Janiva Ellis (born 1987) is an American painter based in Brooklyn, NY and Los Angeles, CA. Ellis often makes figurative paintings that explore the African-American female experience.

Early life and education
Born in Oakland, California, Ellis moved to Hawaii at the age of 7, moving between the islands of Kauai and Oahu. Raised solely by her white mother, in a state with a small black population, Ellis uses her art practice to investigate and examine the complex racial dynamic of her upbringing. Ellis studied painting at California College of the Arts in San Francisco, graduating in 2012.

Artistic practice
Ellis describes her paintings as “not only an attempt to communicate to nonblack women my experience, but also to call to other black women, ‘Do you feel this, too?’” Critics have commended Ellis for the psychoanalytic tension in her paintings. Occasionally, the paintings incorporate religious symbology; such as lambs or angels, referencing the canon of religious painting. In 2017, Ellis presented "Lick Shot" at 47 Canal, her first solo show in New York City. In 2018, Ellis participated in the New Museum Triennial - “Songs for Sabotage.” Ellis was included in the 2019 Whitney Biennial curated by Rujeko Hockley and Jane Panetta.

Selected exhibitions

2017 - "You Catch More Flies With Arsenic Than Honey” - Club Pro, Los Angeles, California
2017 - "Cabin Fever" - BBQLA, Los Angeles California
2017 - Lick Shot”  - 47 Canal, New York City
2017 - Prick Up Your Ears”  - Karma International, Los Angeles, California
2018 - “Painting: Now & Forever, Part III” - Greene Naftali, New York City
2018 - Triennial: “Songs for Sabotage”  - New Museum, New York City
2019 - Whitney Biennial 2019, Whitney Museum of American Art, New York City

Awards

Rema Hort Mann Foundation Grant, 2018
Stanley Hollander Award, 2018

References

External links
Janiva Ellis | Contemporary Art Daily
Janiva Ellis - 30 UNDER 35 2018 - Cultured Magazine

Living people
African-American painters
1987 births
Artists from Oakland, California
People from Hawaii
American contemporary painters
21st-century African-American people
20th-century African-American people